Naya sanwara is a village in Sirohi district of Rajasthan.

On the border of this village very big lake is here(south-east)  .There is big Ambe Mata Temple near lake. There is also some sights of old city called Lodargadh near to the temple of Faleji.

See also
List of lakes in India

References

Villages in Sirohi district